General elections were held in Niue on 26 April 1975.

Background
The new constitution approved in a 1974 referendum provided for a 21-member Assembly consisting of a Speaker and 20 elected members. Fourteen of the members were elected from single-member constituencies based on the 14 villages, and six from an island-wide constituency.

Campaign
A total of 15 candidates contested the island-wide seats. Eleven of the fourteen village constituencies had only one candidate, who was returned unopposed.

Results
Two women were elected, becoming the first female members of the Assembly. One was Patricia Rex, wife of Leader of Government Business Robert Rex. Two of Rex's other relatives running in the election (his son Robert and uncle Leslie) were unsuccessful.

Aftermath
When the newly elected Assembly met five days after the election, Sam Pata Emani Tagelagi was reappointed as Speaker.

Robert Rex was elected Premier and reappointed the three incumbent ministers to the cabinet, Enetama Lipitoa, Frank Lui and Young Vivian.

References

Niue
1975 in Niue
Elections in Niue
April 1975 events in Oceania